Alex Moazed is an American entrepreneur and author. Moazed is the Founder and CEO of Applico. In 2016, Macmillan published his book, Modern Monopolies, which defines the platform business model.

Business career
While a junior in college, Moazed founded Applico with a few personal credit cards in 2009. By 2014, the company achieved $10 million in revenue. With the publication of Modern Monopolies in 2016, Moazed focused his expertise on the platform business model appearing regularly on business television networks like Yahoo Finance, Bloomberg, and Fox News

In May 2019, WisdomTree Investments launched the world's first platform business ETF (NYSE:PLAT) based on data that Alex and Applico licensed to WisdomTree.

Published works 
  Modern Monopolies: What It Takes to Dominate the 21st Century Economy. (2016)

References 

21st-century American businesspeople
Year of birth missing (living people)
Living people